Svatopluk Němeček (born 23 February 1972, Bohumín) is a Czech politician and doctor, from 2014 to 2016 he served as the Czech Minister of Health in the government of Bohuslav Sobotka. From 2005 until 2014 he was the director of the Faculty Hospital in Ostrava, and from 2012 to 2014 he was a regional council-member of the Moravian-Silesian Region.

References 

1972 births
Czech Social Democratic Party Government ministers
Health ministers of the Czech Republic
Living people
Palacký University Olomouc alumni
Czech hospital administrators
People from Bohumín